Yemişlik is a quarter of the city of Elazığ, Elazığ Province in Turkey. Its population is 1,028 (2021). The village is populated by Kurds.

References

Elazığ
Kurdish settlements in Elazığ Province